Triplarina nitchaga is a species of flowering plant in the myrtle family, Myrtaceae and is endemic to a restricted area of north Queensland. It is a shrub with lance-shaped leaves with the narrower end towards the base, flowers with five sepals, five white petals and seventeen or eighteen stamens.

Description

Taxonomy and naming
Triplarina nitchaga was first formally described by Anthony Bean in 1995 and the description was published in the journal Austrobaileya from specimens collected near Nitchaga Creek near Ravenshoe in 1994. The specific epithet (nitchaga) refers to the type location.

Distribution and habitat
This triplarina is only known from two localities near Ravenshoe where it grows in open forest.

Conservation status
Triplarina nitchaga is classified as "vulnerable" under the Australian Government Environment Protection and Biodiversity Conservation Act 1999 and the Queensland Government Nature Conservation Act 1992.

References

nitchaga
Flora of Queensland
Plants described in 1995
Taxa named by Anthony Bean